The 1910 Dickinson Red and White football team was an American football team that represented Dickinson College in Carlisle, Pennsylvania. The team compiled a 3–7 record while competing as an independent during the 1910 college football season. J. Troutman Gougler was the head coach.

Schedule

References

Dickinson
Dickinson Red Devils football seasons
Dickinson Red and White football